Aarni is a masculine given name. Notable people with the name include:

 Aarni Neuvonen (20th century), Estonian criminal
 Markus Aarni Erämies Kajo (born 1957), Finnish reporter, screenwriter, and television host

Finnish masculine given names